The Aero A.23 was a Czechoslovakian airliner of the 1920s. Aero Vodochody had produced the first Czech airliner, the A.10, four of which had served with ČSA, the national airline. The A.23, another biplane, was bigger, more powerful and could carry more passengers.

Design and development

The Avia A.23 was a single bay biplane with its wings mounted without stagger. Both wings were almost rectangular, though the tips were slightly angled; both carried light dihedral. The upper wing was a little larger in both span and chord and was in three parts, with a short centre-section held over the fuselage on a low cabane. The lower wing was in two parts and mounted on the lower fuselage, braced to the upper wing with a pair of outward-leaning, parallel interplane struts made of profiled steel tubes. Only the upper wings carried ailerons. The wings were two-spar wooden structures and were fabric covered.

Its single engine was an uncowled,  Walter-built Jupiter IV on a steel tube mounting and with a pair of long, airfoil-section fuel tanks placed on the upper wing near the ends of the centre-section. Each passenger in the fixed places had a window in the plywood walls. There was engine access via a hatch in the front of the cabin and a toilet at the back. Doors over the wings gave access to the cabin. The A.23 was flown from an open, side-by-side cockpit in the upper fuselage aft of the cabin, with the captain on the left and second pilot/radio operator at his right. A door below the right-hand seat gave access to the engine hatch via the cabin. The cockpit was normally accessed through a low, tetragonal, port-side door. Behind them was a baggage hold.

The A.23's straight-edged tailplane, mounted on the upper fuselage and strut-braced from below, was adjustable in flight and carried separate rounded, balanced elevators.  Its fin was small, with a large, rounded, balanced rudder which extended down to the keel and worked in a gap between the elevators. All components were steel-framed and fabric-covered.

Its fixed, conventional undercarriage originally had mainwheels on a single axle, mounted on V-struts from the lower fuselage with wire cross-bracing. The rear components of the V-struts had rubber disc shock absorbers. By May 1928 the axle had gone and the landing gear made more robust with a transverse X-strut. A castoring steel tailskid had its own rubber shock absorber.

Operational history

The first A.23 flew in 1926. From 1928, seven A.23s flew ČSA's Prague-Marienbad (Mariánské Lázně) and Prague-Uzhhorod; some remained in service until 1936.

Operators

ČSA

Specifications

See also

References

1920s Czechoslovakian airliners
A023
Biplanes
Single-engined tractor aircraft
Aircraft first flown in 1926